Cuneocuboid ligament may refer to:

 Dorsal cuneocuboid ligament
 Interosseous cuneocuboid ligament
 Plantar cuneocuboid ligament